Berden de Vries (born 10 March 1989) is a Dutch former racing cyclist and speed skater. In 2008 he earned a bronze medal at the World Junior Speed Skating Championships at Changchun, behind fellow Dutchmen Jan Blokhuijsen and Koen Verweij. He rode at the 2013 UCI Road World Championships.

Major results

2010
 10th Overall Tour de Berlin
2012
 9th Overall Tour du Loir-et-Cher
2013
 2nd Overall Boucle de l'Artois
 4th Zuid Oost Drenthe Classic II
 10th Overall Tour du Loir-et-Cher
2014
 1st  Overall Olympia's Tour
1st Stages 1 & 2 (TTT)
 6th Arnhem–Veenendaal Classic
 8th Dwars door Drenthe
 10th Arno Wallaard Memorial
2015
 10th Tro-Bro Léon

References

External links
 

1989 births
Living people
Dutch male cyclists
Dutch male speed skaters
People from Aa en Hunze
Cyclists from Drenthe